Khushipur is a town located in the Punjab province of Pakistan. It is located in Lahore District at 31°16'0N 73°9'0E with an altitude of 170 metres (561 feet) and lies near to the city of Lahore. Neighbouring settlements include Singh Khalsa and Kot Guraya to the south, Gobindsar to the east and Miranpur to the west.

References

Populated places in Lahore District